Ronald Eric Leslie Westerby (24 October 1920 – 3 July 1997) was a New Zealand professional rugby league footballer who played in the 1940s.

Playing career

International honours
Westerby represented New Zealand in 1949 against Australia.

References

1920 births
1997 deaths
New Zealand national rugby league team players
New Zealand rugby league players
Place of birth missing
Rugby league props
Rugby league second-rows
Wellington rugby league team players